The 2010 La Tropicale Amissa Bongo took place from January 19 to 24. It was the fifth edition of the La Tropicale Amissa Bongo. This edition of the race consisted of six stages.

Stages

References

La Tropicale Amissa Bongo
2010 in Gabonese sport
La Tropicale Amissa Bongo
2010 in African sport